Guess How Much I Love You is a British children's book written by Sam McBratney and illustrated by Anita Jeram, published in 1994, in the United Kingdom by Walker Books and in 1995, in the United States by its subsidiary Candlewick Press.  The book was a 1996 ALA Notable Children's Book.  According to its publishers, in addition to the ALA award and numerous other awards, it has sold more than 43 million copies worldwide and been published in 57 languages.

Based on a 2007 online poll, the National Education Association in the U.S. listed the book as one of its "Teachers' Top 100 Books for Children." Guess How Much I Love You has been published in several different formats, suitable for children from age 1½ to 8. It has been adapted as a television cartoon show in the U.S.

Plot summary
Guess How Much I Love You follows the story of two hares, Big Nutbrown Hare and Little Nutbrown Hare. It is never stated that the two hares are father and son in the original storybooks, but this is stated in the animated television series. Little Nutbrown Hare asks Big Nutbrown Hare the title question, "Guess how much I love you?", and the book continues as the two use larger and larger measures to quantify how much they love each other in answer to the question.

Subsequent Nutbrown Hare books
In 2007, two additional Nutbrown Hare books were published: When I'm Big: A Guess How Much I Love You Storybook and Colors Everywhere: A Guess How Much I Love You Storybook, later released as a set. In 2008, Let's Play in the Snow: A Guess How Much I Love You Storybook was published. And in 2009, A Surprise for the Nutbrown Hares: A Guess How Much I Love You Storybook was published. The Adventures of Little Nutbrown Hare, a 72-page, four-story compilation, was released on August 28, 2012. It features the tales "The Hiding Tree," "On Cloudy Mountain," "The Far Field," and "Coming Home." Its illustrations were provided by Andy Wanger and Debbie Tarbett, "in the style of Anita Jeram."

2011 TV series

In 2011, an animated adaptation of Guess How Much I Love You began airing through Canada's TVO Kids and United States' Disney Junior. The show is produced by SLR Productions Australia (Suzanne Ryan) and Scrawl Studios and distributed by CCI Entertainment. Reception for the show has been positive and in 2013, it received an AACTA Award nomination for "Best Children's Television Series". It was renewed for a second season.

References

External links

1994 children's books
20th-century British children's literature
British children's books
British picture books
Books about rabbits and hares
Books about families
Walker Books books